Wang Qiu Hong is a paralympic athlete from China competing mainly in category F44 long and high jump events.

He competed at the 2004 Summer Paralympics where as well as being a part of the unsuccessful Chinese 4 × 100 m relay team he also competed in the long jump and won a bronze medal in the F44/46 high jump

References

External links
 

Year of birth missing (living people)
Living people
Paralympic athletes of China
Paralympic bronze medalists for China
Paralympic medalists in athletics (track and field)
Athletes (track and field) at the 2004 Summer Paralympics
Medalists at the 2004 Summer Paralympics
Chinese male high jumpers
Chinese male long jumpers
21st-century Chinese people